Peaches Browning (born Frances Belle Heenan; June 23, 1910August 23, 1956), was an American actress. She was married to New York City real estate developer Edward West "Daddy" Browning (1875 – 1934). Their story became one of the most sensational "scandals" of the Roaring Twenties. It is often cited in journalism history texts as an example of the excesses of tabloid newspapers during the era.

Biography

Browning and Heenan met at a sorority dance on the evening of March 5, 1926, at the Hotel McAlpin and immediately began a very public courtship, despite the difference in their ages. Browning was 51, and Heenan was 15. Browning, who reveled in publicity, paraded Heenan in front of the paparazzi cameras as he lavished her with expensive gifts (spending $1000 a day on shopping trips) and took her to New York's finest restaurants in his distinctive peacock blue Rolls-Royce automobile. On April 10, 1926, mere weeks after they met, Peaches and "Daddy" were wed in the village of Cold Spring, New York, far from media scrutiny. Both Peaches' father and her mother gave their permission for the marriage, which took place in part to thwart a campaign by Vincent Pisarra of the New York Society for the Prevention of Cruelty to Children to halt the May/December relationship.

On October 2, 1926, Peaches and her mother loaded up their belongings and left the marital residence at the Kew Gardens Inn. Under New York law at the time, divorce was only possible if one party admitted adultery, so Peaches tried to obtain a legal separation, claiming cruelty, while Browning filed a counter-claim of abandonment.

The White Plains, New York, trial drew intense coverage by New York City tabloid newspapers such as the New York Daily News, the rival New York Daily Mirror and the more disreputable New York Graphic, which published a series of notorious composographs of the couple. The story was covered in depth by the national newspapers, from the tabloids to The New York Times and the couple became well known in U.S. popular culture of the time. Their romance is referenced in the 1927 Gershwin musical comedy Funny Face and F. Scott Fitzgerald's short story "The Love Boat", published the same year. Among the notable aspects of the case were Peaches' allegations of odd behavior by her husband, including the fact that he kept a honking African goose in their bedroom. The phrase "Don't be a goof," which Daddy allegedly used as an insult to Peaches, came into national vogue, and later turned up in the lyrics of the title song from the 1936 Rodgers and Hart musical comedy On Your Toes. The judge accepted Daddy's version of the facts, ruling that Peaches had abandoned her husband without cause, and permitted him a legal separation without any obligation to pay alimony.

Peaches' notoriety gained her a career in vaudeville. She was managed by Marvin Welt (1883–1953), one of the first theatrical agents to demand a percentage of total ticket sales for some of his clients. 
 
Peaches remained legally married to Browning until his death from a brain hemorrhage, in 1934. She went on to have three more husbands.

She slipped in her bathroom within her apartment at 423 East Fiftieth Street. She died at New York Hospital in Manhattan, New York City, on August 23, 1956, at age 46. She is buried in the Ferncliff Cemetery in Hartsdale, New York.

References

Further reading
Greenburg, Michael, Peaches & Daddy, The Overlook Press, 2008.

1910 births
1956 deaths
American stage actresses
Burials at Ferncliff Cemetery
Vaudeville performers
20th-century American actresses